Mono is the fourth studio album by German rock band Fury in the Slaughterhouse. The album was originally released through SPV and Slaughterhouse Records in November 1993. The album was re-released through RCA Records in 1994, bringing the band an international audience. A remastered version with bonus tracks was released through Kick It Out Records on 29 August 2005.

About
The song "When I'm Dead and Gone" is a cover of the song originally by McGuinness Flint and features drum samples of John Bonham from the Led Zeppelin song "D'yer Mak'er".

Track listing

Personnel
Fury in the Slaughterhouse
 Kai-Uwe Wingenfelder – lead vocals
 Thorsten Wingenfelder – guitar, backing vocals
 Chirstof Stein – guitar, backing vocals
 Hannes Schäfer – bass
 Gero Drnek – keyboards, guitar, backing vocals
 Rainer Schumann – drums (except for track 4)

Additional
 Jens Krause – producer, engineer, mixing, drums on track 4
 Hilko Schomerus – percussion on tracks 2–8, 10-12
 Britt Peters – backing vocals on tracks 4 and 7
 Sabine Bulthaup – backing vocals on track 7
 Martin Malzahn – backing vocals on track 10
 Martin Stoll – oboe on track 9
 Donar Kebab – artwork conception and realization
 Olaf Heine – booklet and back cover photography
 Jim Rakete – front cover photography

References

1993 albums
Fury in the Slaughterhouse albums
SPV GmbH albums
RCA Records albums